Palpana (from , ram) is a volcano in the Andes of Chile.

It is part of the dividing range between Upper Loa River basin and Salar de Ascotán basin.

The volcano contains basaltic rocks with an extrusion formed from more silicic rock. Layers of mafic andesite, scoria and some pumice extend outwards away from the central sector. Olivine and plagioclase phenocrysts are found in the andesites, the overall SiO2 content is 57.6-58.9% in samples from the southern ridge. The volcano probably formed in a short timespan, given the mountainous composition and form.

The volcano is no more than 1-2 mya old, but there is no evidence of postglacial material and erosion has carved radial ridges into the volcano. Precise dating methods performed on the southeastern flank have found ages of 3.65±0.15 mya and 3.81±0.30 for lavas and scoria. The snowline altitude in the area is  Four moraine stages are found on the mountain, with the lowest moraines on the southern flank at  altitude. The mountain is also one of the headwaters of the Loa River, and water was transferred from Palpana to Antofagasta by pipeline. A minor vegetation cover of 20-25% of the surface is present.

The mountain is worshipped by pastoralist people who inhabit the surrounding land, and remnants of a sanctuary have been found on its summit.

See also
 Cerro Chela
 Cerro de las Cuevas
 List of mountains in the Andes
 List of Ultras of South America

Notes

References

External links
 "Palpana, Chile" on Peakbagger
 

Volcanoes of Antofagasta Region
Six-thousanders of the Andes
Stratovolcanoes of Chile
Pliocene stratovolcanoes